Wanlop Sae-chew (born October 20, 1986), simply known as Rong, is a Thai professional footballer who plays as a goalkeeper.

Honours

Club
Thai Port
 Thai FA Cup (1): 2009
 Thai League Cup (1): 2010

Chiangrai United
 Thai League Cup (1): 2018
 Thai FA Cup (1): 2018

External links
 Profile at Goal
https://us.soccerway.com/players/wanlop-sae-jiu/119042/

1986 births
Living people
Wanlop Saechio
Wanlop Saechio
Wanlop Saechio
Association football goalkeepers
Wanlop Saechio
Wanlop Saechio
Wanlop Saechio
Wanlop Saechio
Wanlop Saechio